Göran Karlsson's Motor Museum is a museum of classic cars and motorcycles, opened in Sweden in .

Göran Karlsson started Gekås in Ullared, Sweden in 1963 which today is the largest big-box store in Scandinavia. He was a dedicated collector. The museum has a number of cars of different brands and marques, such as Lamborghini and Chevrolet, where one of the museum's most precious cars is an Excalibur SS Series 1 Roadster that once belonged to the Swedish boxer Ingemar Johansson.

References

External links
 Göran Karlsson's Motor Museum

Automobile museums in Sweden
Technology museums
Museums in Halland County